Mariano Eduardo de Rivero y Ustariz (October 22, 1798 – November 6, 1857) was a prominent Peruvian scientist, geologist, mineralogist, chemist, archaeologist, politician and diplomat. His publications about his discovery of Humboldtine (an iron-oxalate), demonstrating the existence of organic-minerals; about deposits of copper and sodium nitrate (saltpeter) near Tarapacá in the Atacama Desert; about bird-guano and coal in Peru and their possibilities of industrialization as well were forward-looking and made him a pioneer of mining education in South America and the most notable Peruvian scientist of the 19th century.

Biographical highlights
Mariano Eduardo de Rivero y Ustariz was born in Arequipa, Peru. His parents were Antonio Salvador de Rivero y Araníbar, captain in the Spanish Royal Army in the viceroyalty of Peru, and Maria Brígida de Ustariz y Zúñiga.

Rivero was born in a liberal Creole family in southern Peru at the end of the colonial period. He was first educated at the Seminary of San Jerónimo in Arequipa. After noticing his aptitudes and qualifications, his family sent him to Europe and, at the age of twelve in 1810, he started his European education in England, a major rival of Spain at the dawn of the wars of independence. He attended a Catholic School directed by Dr. Dowling in London. There, he focused on mathematics, physics, and languages (English, French, and German). Once he completed secondary school and some advanced classes in 1817, he moved to France, where he studied at the École Polytechnique and then the École des Mines (Mines ParisTech), both in Paris. At the École des Mines, he learned from many of the most prominent scientists of that time and specialized in mineralogy and chemistry. Among his professors, there were Joseph Louis Proust, Joseph Louis Gay-Lussac, Alexandre Brongniart, Pierre Berthier, and René Just Haüy. A major event in Rivero's life was his encounter with Alexander von Humboldt. The German savant provided him with letters of recommendation that opened to him the doors of several European academic circles. Among them, Rivero completed his mineralogical training at the Freiberg School of Mines, Humboldt's alma mater, where he conducted his first fieldwork. During this long trip throughout Europe, he also visited mines in France and Spain, where he further improved his knowledge of mining techniques.

His return to the Americas also occurred under the tutelage of Humboldt. In 1822, Francisco Antonio Zea delivered a Simon Bolívar's letter to Humboldt. There Bolívar asked Humboldt to send a scientific mission to both investigate the natural resources of the new Republic of the Gran Colombia and to establish a museum of natural history as well as a mining school. The German scholar, who saw Rivero as a prominent disciple, named him head of the mission. After three years in which he maintained a constant correspondence with his European colleagues, Rivero left Colombia because of a lack of economic and political support. Bolívar then recommended his recruitment to the Peruvian government for the development of similar projects. From 1826 onwards, Rivero undertook several enterprises in his home country: he fostered a scientific journal, founded the first National Museum, created the School of Mines, served as prefect in mining regions, published extensively on mineral resources, and wrote the first antiquarian study of postcolonial Peru: Antigüedades peruanas. This book was published in Vienna in 1851 upon his return to Europe and was translated into English, French, and German soon after. Reinserted in the European academic world, he gave several talks on Peruvian resources and antiquities until he died in Paris in 1857, directly after publishing a collection of his scientific memoirs in Brussels.

Mariano Eduardo married on February 18, 1840, with Agueda Escolástica Pacheco de Salas y Salazar. They had four children, but only their daughters Candelaria and Francisca Guillermina survived childhood.

Scientific career
He discovered a new mineral originated in Bohemia (now Czech Republic) and called it Humboldtine (an iron-oxalate), in honor to Alexander von Humboldt, his mentor and friend. He published his first scientific works about that issue among others in 1821 in France.

The president of Gran-Colombia, the liberator Simón Bolívar, decided to contract European scientists to investigate the available sources of his new formed nation, and to push with that the development of natural sciences and mining technology in South America at all. Bolivar's main target of that project was to develop the economy of the young nation. The minister of Gran-Colombia in Paris, Francisco Antonio Zea, contracted Mariano Eduardo in May 1822, who had been highly recommended by Alexander von Humboldt, to found and to manage a mining school in Bogotá together with a group of young European scientists. Therefore, Mariano Eduardo made the necessary trip preparation. He bought some laboratory equipment and ordered constructions of precisions instruments for certain measurements.

Mariano Eduardo returned to South America and arrived in November 1822 at La Guaira, Venezuela with the French chemist Jean Baptiste Boussingault. They studied in Venezuela the thermal springs of Mariara and Onoto, the exploitation of mineral salts in Urao Lake and the secretion of the cow-tree (this tree produces drinkable milk) and he also made barometric observations. They left Venezuela and arrived in Bogotá, Colombia, in May 1823 where encountered with general Bolivar. He inaugurated in Bogotá a museum of natural history and a mining school in November 1823 as its first director. Mariano Eduardo and his scientific group did expeditions to the orient plain of Colombia. He published the report Itinerario de los Llanos de San Martín y del río Meta in his Colección de memorias científicas …, printed in 1857.

Simón Bolívar (president of Gran-Colombia 1819-1830 and also president of Peru 1824-1827) enabled Manuel Eduardo's return to his home country Peru. Mariano Eduardo left Bogotá and arrived in Lima at the end of 1825. The government of Peru appointed him in March 1826 as general director of mining, agriculture, public instruction and museum. He founded in 1828 the first Mining School of Lima (today Universidad Nacional de Ingeniería) and the first National Museum of Natural History, Antiquities and History of Peru (today Museo Nacional de Arqueología, Antropología e Historia del Perú).

Mariano Eduardo made scientific studies, traveled through Peru and founded in Lima with Nicolas Fernandez de Piérola a journal of natural sciences (Memorial de Ciencias Naturales y de Industria Nacional y Extranjera), where he published between 1827 and 1829 a lot of scientific articles and papers about amalgamation of silver, exploitation of guano, analysis of the mineral water from the thermal springs of Yura and other locations in Arequipa, reports of the visited mine areas in Peru and description of gold, silver and ceramic idols.

In 1829 general Antonio Gutiérrez de la Fuente made a revolt against the government and became the new president of Peru. He cut the position of the direction of mining, because of actual economic crisis. This and the unstable political situation in Peru induced Mariano Eduardo to leave Peru and to immigrate to Chile, where he made studies about meteorology, mineralogy and geology.

Political career
He returned to Peru in 1832 and got back to his previous position, continued his scientific activities and started in addition a political career. He had been elected in 1832 as a deputy to the congress for the province of Caylloma (department of Arequipa). General Felipe Santiago Salaverry, president of Peru (1835–1836), appointed him in 1835 to become his counselor.
Under the presidency of general Agustín Gamarra (1838–1841) Mariano Eduardo was appointed as inspector of public works. In 1839 he was custom chief officer of Arica (today Chile). During the presidency of marshal Ramón Castilla (1844–1851 and 1855–1862) Mariano Eduardo was appointed in 1845 to become governor of Junín Region (central Peru) and in 1848 governor of the department of Moquegua (south Peru). As governor of Junin he founded the city of San Ramón and a central mining school in Huánuco as well.

Diplomatic career
The president of Peru, marshal Ramón Castilla, appointed him in 1851 as General Consul in Belgium. He was awarded by the king of Belgium with the Leopold Order and by the king of Denmark with the Dannebrog Order in appreciation his diplomatic performance.

He published in Vienna 1851 with Johann Jakob von Tschudi, acting as co-author, their common publication Antigüedades Peruanas about the Inca Empire. That book was a profound work about the Inca Empire, its history, origin, government system, scientific knowledge, language, religion, customs and monuments.
He published in Brussels 1857 his work Colección de memorias científicas, agrícolas e industriales publicadas en distintas épocas, etc.. That work, a book in 2 volumes, was a collection of his already published articles about natural science, geology, mineralogy, mining and agriculture.
Mariano Eduardo de Rivero y Ustariz died in Paris on November 22, 1857.

Published works
Rivero y Ustariz, M. de /1821/ "Note sur une combinaison de l'acide oxalique avec le fer trouve a Kolowsereux, prés Belin, en Bohême". Annales de chimie et de physique, Paris, 18 : 207-210
Rivero y Ustariz, M. de /1821/ "Note sur le cuivre muriate du Pérou, et sur le nitrate de soude trouve dans le district d’Atacama, prés du port de Iquique". Annales de chimie et de physique, Paris, 18 : 442-443
Rivero y Ustariz, M. de /1821/ "Note sur le nitrate de soude découvert dans le district de Tarapacá au Pérou". Annales de Mines, Paris, 6 : 596
Rivero y Ustariz, M. de and Boussingault, J.B. /1824/ "Mémoire sur différentes masses de Fer qui ont trouvés sur la Cordillère orientale des Andes". Annales de chimie et de physique, 25:438-443
Rivero y Ustariz, M. de and Boussingault, J.B. /1825/ "Mémoire sur le fait vénéneux de l’hura crépitant". Annales de chimie et de physique, 28: 430-435
Rivero y Ustariz, M. de /1825/ "Mémoire sur l'urao (carbonate de soude)". Annales de chimie et de physique, Paris, 29: 110-111
Rivero y Ustariz, M. de /1827/ Memoria sobre las aguas minerales de Yura y de otras partes cercanas a Arequipa, con aplicaciones médicas por los ss Vargas, J.M. y Adriazola Arve, J.M,  Lima
Rivero y Ustariz, Mariano Eduardo de and Fernández de Piérola, Nicolás / 1827-1829/ Memorial de Ciencias Naturales y de Industria Nacional y Extranjera. Imprenta de Instrucción Primaria, Lima (12 Journals published between 1827 and 1829)
Rivero y Ustariz, M. de /1836/ "Notice géologique sur Santiago de Chile". Annales des mines, Paris, 10: 279-288
Rivero y Ustariz, M. de / 1841/ Antigüedades Peruanas, Lima, Imp. de José Masias.
Rivero y Ustariz, M. de / 1848/ Memoria sobre el rico mineral de azogue de Huancavelica, Lima, Imp. de José Masias
Rivero y Ustariz, M. de and Tschudi, Johann Jakob von / 1851/ Antigüedades Peruanas, Viena, Imprenta Imperial de la Corte y Estado
Rivero y Ustariz, M. de / 1853/ Peruvian Antiquities … translated into English from the original by F. L. Hawks, etc., New York
Rivero y Ustariz, M. de / 1857/ Colección de memorias científicas, agrícolas e industriales publicadas en distintas épocas, etc., Brussels, Printer. H. Goemaere, 2 volume

Bibliography

External links
 Mariano Eduardo de Rivero y Ustariz, Pioneer

1798 births
1857 deaths
Peruvian people of Spanish descent
Peruvian archaeologists
Peruvian diplomats
Peruvian scientists
Peruvian chemists
Members of the Chamber of Deputies of Peru
Mines Paris - PSL alumni